The Second Battle of Châtillon (11 October 1793) was fought between Royalist and Republican French forces at Châtillon-sur-Sèvre during the War in the Vendée. A 20,000-man Republican column commanded by Alexis Chalbos from the Army of the Coasts of La Rochelle was attacked and routed by Vendean Royalist forces led by Louis Marie de Lescure and Charles de Bonchamps. That night a few hundred Republicans under François Joseph Westermann raided the rebel encampment. Before the Vendeans killed or drove them off, the raiders inflicted severe losses on drunken rebel fighters and non-combatant women and children. The Vendeans withdrew toward Mortagne-sur-Sèvre the next day. Republican general René François Lecomte was mortally wounded in the battle, dying a few days later.

References

Battles involving France
Conflicts in 1793
Battles of the War in the Vendée
Battles in Nouvelle-Aquitaine
History of Deux-Sèvres
1793 in France